is a 1984 Japanese film. Describing the impact of the United States' occupation of Japan from the perspective of the inhabitants of a small, rural island community, the film featured the big screen debut of actor Ken Watanabe.

The film was selected as the Japanese entry for the Best Foreign Language Film at the 57th Academy Awards, but was not accepted as a nominee.

Cast
 Takaya Yamauchi as Ryuta
 Yoshiyuki Omori as Saburo
 Shiori Sakura as Takeme "Mume" Hatano
 Masako Natsume as Komako
 Hideji Ōtaki as Ashigara
 Haruko Kato as Haru
 Ken Watanabe as Tetsuo
 Shima Iwashita as Tome
 Hiromi Go as Masao Nakai

Production
 Yoshinobu Nishioka -Art direction

Location
Filmed on Manabeshima, a small island fishing community in the Kasaoka Islands, of Okayama Prefecture on the Seto Inland Sea.

See also
 List of submissions to the 57th Academy Awards for Best Foreign Language Film
 List of Japanese submissions for the Academy Award for Best Foreign Language Film

References

External links

1984 films
1984 drama films
Films directed by Masahiro Shinoda
Japanese drama films
1980s Japanese-language films
1980s Japanese films